

Studio albums

Solo singles

Produced albums

Produced singles

Promos 
 Danger Mouse Promo: Volume 1 (1998)
 Danger Mouse Promo: Volume 2 (1999)
 Danger Mouse Promo: Volume 3 (2000)
 Danger Mouse Promo: Volume 4 (2000)
 Danger Mouse Promo: Remix EP 12" White (2001)
 Danger Mouse Promo: Remix EP 12" Red (2002)
 Danger Mouse Promo: Remix EP 12" Yellow (2003)

Contributions 

 Toonami Blackhole Megamix (2003) – As Pelican City
 Toonami Supernova Megamix (2012) – As Pelican City
 Remix of To a Black Boy by The Free Design on The Now Sound Redesigned (2005) – Danger Mouse and Murs remix

References 

Danger Mouse (musician) albums
Discographies of American artists